Camilo Monroy Restrepo (born September 25, 1998) is a Colombian footballer.

Career

Professional 
Monroy joined Houston Dynamo's United Soccer League affiliate Rio Grande Valley FC Toros on March 23, 2017 from América de Cali.

References

1998 births
Association football forwards
Colombian expatriate footballers
Colombian footballers
Expatriate soccer players in the United States
Living people
Rio Grande Valley FC Toros players
USL Championship players
People from Itagüí
Sportspeople from Antioquia Department